Aquimonas is a Gram-negative and aerobic genus of bacteria from the family of Rhodanobacteraceae with one known species (Aquimonas voraii). Aquimonas voraii has been isolated from water from a warm spring from Assam in India.

References

Xanthomonadales
Bacteria genera
Monotypic bacteria genera